Waihai is a subdistrict of the Jianghai District in Jiangmen City, Guangdong Province, southern China.

References 

Jiangmen
Township-level divisions of Guangdong